Gustav Bruemmer (German Brümmer, born April 23, 1905, in Kiel, died July 4, 1970, pseudonym: Guschi) was a German watchmaker and headmaster at the watchmaking school in Hamburg.

Life and achievements

Bruemmer left school in 1920, having acquired the O-level qualification. He learned the craft of watchmaking in Glashütte and took the trade test in 1924. His test work is now exhibited in the Museum of the School of Watchmaking in Glashuette. From 1927 to 1929 he attended the German School of Watchmaking Bruemmer Glashuette. He studied at the Vocational Teacher Training Institute and the Graduate School of Berlin. From 1931 to 1933 he trained as a commercial teacher. In his thesis he wrote about "Vocational education in watchmaking." In 1933 he had a practical educational year at the trade school in Lokstedt-Niendorf. In 1934 he took on various teaching assignments in Hamburg and married his wife Gertrude in the same year. From 1 April 1936 he was a fully employed teacher at the vocational school in Lokstedt-Niendorf. The monthly salary amount was then 236.37 Reichsmark.
In 1940 he started as a teacher in the state sector School of Watchmaking Altona, Hamburg. In 1944 he became a commercial senior teacher at the same school.
Since that time he wrote many technical articles for the journal "The Clock" (organ of the Central Association of the Watchmaker). [2] In 1952 he published the still-used book "Applied Mathematics for Watchmakers" as the third edition of the textbook series "The Watchmaking School" of the publisher Hermann Brinkmann with the cooperation of the State School of Watchmaking in Altona and the "Central Association of the Watchmaker".
In 1958 he was technical director at the state school for watchmakers in Hamburg-Altona, until he retired in 1968. Bruemmer died of kidney failure many years after.

Writings (selection)

Applied mathematics for watchmakers. William Knapp Verlag. 15 editions. .
A look at the gear train. The clock, 1949, No.6, p.3
Half of vibrations, oscillations and vibrations double. The clock, 1949, No. 8, p.7
The module - a useful computational size. The clock, 1949, No.12, p.8
The counter ratchet, an auxiliary drive for watches. The clock, 1950, No.12, p.21
Of development and construction of the free escapement. The clock, 1951, No. 2, 4, 6, 8
Of structure and adjustment of the Graham escapement. The clock, 1951, No.18, 20 22,
Ferdinand Adolph Lange - founder of the Glashütte watchmaking. The clock, 1953, No.4, p.33
Of the unrest. The clock, 1954, No.22, p.34
Of the cylinder escapement. The clock, 1955, No.10, p.31

References

 ↑ 125 years of watchmaking school in Hamburg, classical watches, No.4, 2003, (PDF). Accessed 2 February 2013.
 ↑ Glossary of products by 1948 - 1982. Magazine "The Clock" in German Society for chronometry, (XLS). Accessed 6 February 2013.

External links

Scores by Gustav Bruemmer in the catalog that German national library

1905 births
1970 deaths
German watchmakers (people)
German educational theorists